Indirect presidential elections were held in Turkey on 14 May 1954. 513 out of 541 members of the Grand National Assembly participated in the elections, which were held as required by law immediately after the election of the members of the tenth parliament. Incumbent president Celal Bayar was re-elected to the presidency with 486 votes in the first round.

Results

References

Presidential elections in Turkey
President